BBC Radio 2 50s was a short-lived pop-up DAB service from the BBC, that broadcast from 14:00 on Thursday 14 April 2016 until Sunday 17 April 2016. It played music from the 1950s, which had received much less airplay on Radio 2 since the 1990s.

Presenters 

 Don Black
 Desmond Carrington
 Jamie Cullum
 Russell Davies
 Chris Evans
 Len Goodman
 Leo Green
 Sheila Hancock
 Bob Harris
 Richard Hawley
 Paul Jones
 Bill Kenwright
 Stuart Maconie
 Imelda May
 Huey Morgan
 Iggy Pop
 Suzi Quatro
 Mark Radcliffe
 Clare Teal
 Marty Wilde
 Gary Williams
 Steve Wright

See also 
 BBC Radio 2 Country
 BBC Radio 2 Eurovision
 BBC Music Jazz

References

External links 
 
 

 
50s
Radio stations established in 2016
Digital-only radio stations
2016 establishments in the United Kingdom
Radio stations disestablished in 2016
Defunct radio stations in the United Kingdom
2016 disestablishments in the United Kingdom